Martín Andrés Romagnoli (born 30 September 1977 in Leones, Córdoba) is an Argentine former professional footballer who played as a midfielder.

Romagnoli started his career in the 2nd Division with All Boys. In 1998-1999 he spent a season with Spanish team CD Badajoz.

In 1999, he returned to Argentina to play for  Colón de Santa Fe where he played until 2006. In his time at Colón he made 178 appearances for the club.

In 2006, he moved to Quilmes Atlético Club but after a disastrous Apertura where Quilmes finished bottom of the league with only 9 points from 19 games he left Quilmes to join Racing Club.

In 2008, Romagnoli was brought to Toluca a couple of days after the Mexican League had started due to the trade of Ariel Rosada to Celta Vigo.

On May 26, 2012 Romagnoli was loaned to UNAM.

Romagnoli retired from professional football in 2015.

Honours

Club
Toluca
Primera División de México: Apertura 2008, Bicentenario 2010

Individual
Mexican Primera División Best Defensive Midfielder: Bicentenario 2010

External links

Martín Romagnoli – Argentine Primera statistics at Fútbol XXI  

1977 births
Living people
Sportspeople from Córdoba Province, Argentina
Argentine footballers
Argentina international footballers
Argentine expatriate footballers
Argentine expatriate sportspeople in Spain
Association football midfielders
All Boys footballers
Club Atlético Colón footballers
Quilmes Atlético Club footballers
Racing Club de Avellaneda footballers
CD Badajoz players
Argentine Primera División players
Liga MX players
Deportivo Toluca F.C. players
Club Universidad Nacional footballers
Atlante F.C. footballers